"What Is This Feeling?" is a song from the hit musical Wicked. It is sung between Elphaba, Galinda (later Glinda), and the students at Shiz University, expressing their loathing for each other's contrasting personalities as newly-assigned roommates.

Context
The song is performed towards the beginning of the first act. It opens with the two girls, Galinda and Elphaba, writing letters home to their parents in order to complain about their new rooming situation at Shiz University, brought about by Madame Morrible. During the song, Galinda and Elphaba graphically detail their mutual and "unadulterated loathing" toward one another. As the song progresses, the students of Shiz side with Galinda, expressing their admiration of the fact that she can even tolerate Elphaba, and referring to her as a martyr.

The students rally around Galinda and ally against Elphaba, who is universally despised. They claim they will maintain their animosity for their entire lives, stating that every little trait of Elphaba's makes their skin crawl. Elphaba makes the students aware that these feelings are reciprocated, although she does not reveal whether her hatred extends to all of the students, or is reserved exclusively for Galinda.

During the later song, "Dancing Through Life", Galinda's loathing of Elphaba is manifested yet again when, in order to embarrass her in front of everyone at the Ozdust Ballroom, she presents her with a pointed black hat, clearly representative of those traditionally associated with witchcraft, that Galinda received from her grandmother. However, Galinda's conscience soon starts to get the better of her, and in her remorse she approaches Elphaba with an invitation to dance, culminating in the pair eventually becoming friends in "Popular".

Lyrics
Stephen Schwartz meant the song's title and lyrics to be an ironic parody on love songs ("What is this feeling so sudden and new?/I felt the moment I laid eyes on you/My pulse is rushing/My head is reeling/My face is flushing/What is this feeling?/Fervid as a flame/Does it have a name?"). The irony comes in when phrases traditionally used for love songs are revealed to be expressing hate. When Galinda and Elphaba describe each other, Galinda complains about Elphaba being "altogether quite impossible to describe", while Elphaba simply calls Galinda "blonde".

At the end of the song, Elphaba scares Galinda, by saying "Boo", with Galinda letting out a high-pitched squeal.

Songs from Wicked (musical)
2003 songs
Songs written by Stephen Schwartz (composer)
Idina Menzel songs
Kristin Chenoweth songs